Desi PDX, or DesiPDX, is an Indian restaurant in Portland, Oregon.

Description

Desi PDX serves Indian cuisine from a food cart in a pod called Prost Marketplace, in the north Portland part of the Eliot neighborhood. Fodor's and Michael Russell of The Oregonian have described the menu as "Indian fusion". The Portland Mercury Ned Lannamann called Desi PDX an "Indian-themed food cart" with "Indian dishes done Northwest style—or Northwest dishes done Indian style, depending on your viewpoint". He also wrote, "Virtually everything is gluten-free (and dairy-free, except for the creamy, cooling raita that comes on the side), and there are vegan options aplenty on their terrific menu of complex, intricately spiced fare." The cart has dark wood siding and strokes of green and orange paint.

According to Waz Wu of Eater Portland, the business offers "Indian flair with local produce to create a lively gluten-free menu of small bites, salads, and curries. The vegetables change, depending on what's in season, but vegans can always count on the stunning vegan thali, which includes a tandoori chickpea tempeh curry, cabbage slaw with turmeric-mustard vinaigrette, and a green chutney with a kick." The menu has included a tamarind- and ginger-braised pulled pork sandwich served with curry confit onions, chickpeas, and basmati, as well as cardamom chai chicken and rice with fenugreek-seasoned shrimp and tomato-and-lamb stew.

History
Desi PDX is owned by Deepak Saxena. The cart operated from the Cubby Hole pod, which closed in 2017. The business operated a pop-up out of the commissary kitchen Masala Lab PDX, as of early 2022. For Valentine's Day, Desi PDX offered a dinner with chickpea-miso masala lamb shank or vegan tempeh vindaloo as well as radicchio salad with cabbage, roasted Brussels sprouts, candied coriander, and pomegranate vinaigrette, tandoori spiced potatoes with roasted cauliflower sauce and pickled peas, basmati with black cardamom, and citrus cake.

Reception
Desi PDX was included in Yelp's 2016 list of "Top 40 Food Carts in Portland". In 2017, Eater Portland Mattie John Bamman said Desi PDX was "one of the hottest food carts in the city". Ned Lannamann included the restaurant in the Portland Mercury 2019 list of "50 of Portland's Best Multi-Cultural Restaurants and Food Carts", in which he described the business as "unique and excellent". Waz Wu included Desi PDX in Eater Portland 2021 overview of "Where to Find Standout Vegan Curries in Portland". The website's Ron Scott and Janey Wong included the business in 2021 and 2022 overviews of "Where to Find Exceptional Indian Food in Portland".

See also

 List of Indian restaurants

References

External links

 

Asian restaurants in Portland, Oregon
Boise, Portland, Oregon
Food carts in Portland, Oregon
Indian fusion cuisine
Indian restaurants in Oregon
Indian-American culture in Portland, Oregon
North Portland, Oregon